Brent Carver (November 17, 1951 – August 4, 2020) was a Canadian actor best known internationally for performances in both London's West End and on Broadway in Kiss of the Spider Woman as Molina, for which he won the Tony Award for Best Leading Actor in a Musical in 1993 and was nominated for an Olivier Award. A subsequent Broadway appearance in 1999 in Parade as Leo Frank, led to a second nomination for the Tony Award for Best Leading Actor in a Musical.

Early life
Carver was born of Welsh and Irish heritage in Cranbrook, British Columbia, the son of Lois (Wills), a clerk, and Kenneth Carver, who was in the lumber business. He was the third of seven children, none of whom went into show business, apart from himself. He almost became a teacher, but continued participating in theatre. He attended the University of British Columbia from 1969 to 1972. He sang from an early age, with his father who played guitar. Carver's favourite actors were Spencer Tracy and Bette Davis.

Career 
Carver was known for a variety of stage and film roles, including The Wars, Kronborg: 1582, Lilies, Larry's Party, Elizabeth Rex, Millennium, Shadow Dancing, and Unidentified Human Remains and the True Nature of Love. Carver originated the role of Gandalf in the Toronto stage production of The Lord of the Rings and appeared in several Soulpepper Theatre Company productions such as The Wild Duck, Don Carlos and as the Pirate King in the 1985 production of The Pirates of Penzance.

Carver played the character Leo on the series Leo and Me, which aired from 1977 to 1978.

Carver made his U.S. debut in The Tempest, playing Ariel to Anthony Hopkins's Prospero. Carver won a Dora Award as Horst in Bent. His stage work involved an extended association with Canada's Stratford Shakespeare Festival in the 1980s, including an original rock version of Hamlet, as the lead and later in 2000 as Tevye in Fiddler on the Roof.

In 1993, Carver won a Tony Award which he dedicated to the late Canadian actress Susan Wright, who had died two years earlier in a fire in his Stratford house, Ontario. In May 2014, Carver received a Governor General's Performing Arts Award, Canada's highest honour in the performing arts, for his lifetime contribution to Canadian theatre.

Carver portrayed Ichabod Crane in the 1999 TV film The Legend of Sleepy Hollow which aired on Odyssey. He played the title role in "The Trouble with Harry", an episode of the television series Twice in a Lifetime. He portrayed Leonardo da Vinci in Leonardo: A Dream of Flight in 2002.

In 2003, Carver appeared in the Off-Broadway production of My Life With Albertine at Playwrights Horizons, where he portrayed older Marcel and the Narrator. The production received a nomination for the Drama League Award as Distinguished Production of a Musical.

In 2016, Carver performed in a musical show titled Walk Me to the Corner at the Harold Green Jewish Theatre Company in Toronto.

Death
Carver died on August 4, 2020, at the age of 68 at home in Cranbrook.

Credits

Filmography

 The Beachcombers (1972, TV Series)
 Inside Canada (1974, TV Series)
 One Night Stand (1978, TV Movie) as Rafe
 Leo and Me (1978, TV Series) as Leo
 Crossbar (1979, TV Movie) as Aaron Kornylo
 The Wars (1983) as Robert Ross
 Cross Country  (1983) as John Forrest
 Anne's Story (1984, TV Movie)
 Love and Larceny (1985, TV Movie) as Charles Chadwick
 The Pirates of Penzance (1985, TV Movie) as Pirate King
 All for One (1985, TV Movie)
 Adderly (1987, TV Series)
 Much Ado About Nothing (1987, TV Movie) as Don John
 Spies, Lies & Naked Thighs (1988, TV Movie) as Gunther
 Shadow Dancing (1988) as Alexei
 The Twilight Zone (1989, TV Series) as Josef
 War of the Worlds (1989, TV Series) as Jesse
 Millennium (1989) as Coventry
 Love and Hate: The Story of Colin and JoAnn Thatcher (1989, TV Movie) as Tony Merchant
 Street Legal (1989-1994, TV Series) as Scott Farrow #2 / Arthur Fraticelli
 The Hidden Room (1991, TV Series)
 The Shower (1992) as Kevin
 The Song Spinner (1995, TV Movie) as Selmo
 Lilies (1996) as Countess de Tilly
 Margie Gillis: Wild Hearts in Strange Times (1996) as Singer / Dancer
 Leonardo: A Dream of Flight (1996, TV Movie) as Leonardo DaVinci
 Whiskers (1997, TV Movie) as Whiskers
 Due South (1997, TV Series) as Bruce Spender
 Balls Up (1997, TV Movie) as Geoff
 L'histoire de l'Oie (1998, TV Movie) as Maurice (English version)
 The Legend of Sleepy Hollow (1999, TV Movie) as Ichabod Crane
 Twice in a Lifetime (2000, TV Series) as Harry
 Deeply (2000) as Porter
 The City (2000, TV Series) as Sam
 Ararat (2002) as Philip
 The Event (2003) as Brian Knight
 Elizabeth Rex (2004, TV Movie) as Ned Lowenscroft
 This Is Wonderland (2005, TV Series)
 Prairie Giant: The Tommy Douglas Story (2006, TV Mini-Series) as Secretary Balsam
 Lightchasers (2007, Short) as Man
 Romeo and Juliet (2014) as Friar Laurence
 The Whale (2014, Short) as Ryley Crewson

Theatre
 Jacques Brel Is Alive and Well and Living in Paris (1972)
 Bent (1981)
 Hamlet (1986)
 Cabaret (1987)
 Unidentified Human Remains and the True Nature of Love (1990)
 Kiss of the Spider Woman (1993–1995)
 Cyrano de Bergerac (1994)
 Richard II (1995)
 High Life (1996)
 Don Carlos (1998)
 Parade (1998–1999)
 Fiddler on the Roof (2000)
 Larry's Party (2001)
 King Lear (2004)
 Lord of the Rings (2006)
 The Elephant Man (2007)
 As You Like It (2010)
 Romeo and Juliet (2013)
 Evangeline (2015)
 Twelfth Night (2017)
 The School for Scandal (2017)

References

External links
 
 
 
 Brent Carver at the Canadian Encyclopedia

1951 births
2020 deaths
Canadian male film actors
Canadian male voice actors
Canadian male stage actors
Canadian male television actors
Canadian people of Welsh descent
Canadian people of Irish descent
People from Cranbrook, British Columbia
Dora Mavor Moore Award winners
Canadian male musical theatre actors
Male actors from British Columbia
Governor General's Performing Arts Award winners
Tony Award winners
Best Supporting Actor in a Television Film or Miniseries Canadian Screen Award winners